UHS may refer to:

Education
 University of Health Sciences (disambiguation), various entities
 University of Houston System, a system of higher education in the U.S. state of Texas with four universities
 Utica High School (Michigan), a high school located in Utica, Michigan
 Utica High School (Ohio), a high school located in Utica, Ohio
 University High School (disambiguation), a number of high schools
 Unionville High School (Ontario), located in Markham, Ontario, Canada
 Unionville High School (Kennett Square, Pennsylvania), in Chester County, Pennsylvania
 Underwood High School in Underwood, North Dakota
 Urbandale High School, a high school in Urbandale, Iowa

Business and industry
 Universal Health Services, Fortune 500 company

Science and technology
 Ultra High Speed, a speed designation for SD cards
 Uhs, the symbol for the chemical element Unhexseptium

Other uses
 Unified Handicapping System, a handicap system in the sport of golf, used in the United Kingdom and Republic of Ireland
 United Health Services, a health care system serving the Greater Binghamton, N.Y., region
 Universal Hint System, a form of strategy guide for computer and video games
 University Hospital Southampton NHS Foundation Trust, an NHS organisation in Southampton, UK
 University Hospitals Sussex NHS Foundation Trust, an NHS organisation in Sussex, UK